State Road 192 (NM 192) is a , paved, two-lane state highway in Doña Ana County in the U.S. state of New Mexico. NM 192's western terminus is near San Miguel at the road's junction with NM 28. The road's eastern terminus is near Mesquite at the road's junction with NM 478. The road continues as NM 228 from the junction. NM 192 is also known as Mesquite Drive.

Route description
The highway begins at the junction with NM 28 in San Miguel, right across from the United States Post Office building. The road heads northeasterly for  through pecan orchards and fields of Mesilla Valley before turning east. The highway then crosses the Rio Grande river over a  bridge, built in 1992. The road continues east through agricultural areas and at  again turns northeast before reaching the community of Mesquite. Travelling through Mesquite, NM 192 crosses railroad tracks of El Paso Subdivision of BNSF Railway right before reaching its eastern terminus at intersection with NM 478.

History
The section occupied by modern day NM 192 was initially an end segment of NM 28 in Mesquite. In 1930s NM 28 was extended to Mesilla, and the highway section lost its designation as a state road. From late 1950s this stretch was part of NM 228 running between NM 28 and U.S. Route 85 (US 85). In 1988 the New Mexico Department of Transportation (NMDOT) went through a radical road renumbering program, and this stretch was designated as NM 192.

Major intersections

See also

References

External links

192
Transportation in Doña Ana County, New Mexico